Chirets is a rural locality (a village) in Posyolok imeni Zhelyabovo, Ustyuzhensky District, Vologda Oblast, Russia. The population was 3 as of 2002. There are 2 streets.

Geography 
Lychno is the nearest rural locality.

References 

Rural localities in Ustyuzhensky District